26th Street/Bergamot station is an at-grade light rail station in the Los Angeles County Metro Rail system.  It is located near the intersection of 26th Street and Olympic Boulevard in Santa Monica, California and near the Bergamot Station Arts Center. The station is served by the E Line.

Service

Station layout 

The station is in the Pico District of Santa Monica, along the southern edge of Olympic Boulevard, just east of 26th Street.

The City of Santa Monica refers to the station area as the "Bergamot Transit Village".  It is also within walking distance of several business offices and studios, including the Water Garden office complex, as well as several parks.

The station has entrances on both ends.

Hours and frequency

Connections 
, the following connections are available:
 Big Blue Bus (Santa Monica): 5, 16, 43

Notable places nearby 
The station is within walking distance of the following notable places:
Bergamot Station Arts Center
Gandara Park
Ishihara Park
Virginia Avenue Park

Name and history 

The name "Bergamot Station" dates back to  1890, and was a stop and car storage area on the steam powered Los Angeles and Independence Railroad from Santa Monica to downtown Los Angeles, as well as the subsequent Santa Monica Air Line on the Pacific Electric trolley system until 1953.

Vehicle maintenance facility 
Expo Phase 2 includes a maintenance facility for Expo light-rail vehicles.  This facility performs shop-related activities, including servicing, cleaning, inspection and repair of LRT vehicles.  It also includes a yard with a storage capacity of up to 45 LRT vehicles.

Several locations for this facility were proposed and evaluated, including the "Verizon site" (land just east of Bergamot Station, between Stewart Street and Centinela Avenue) and the Bergamot Station site itself.  Use of the Verizon site was opposed by many residents of the surrounding Stewart Park neighborhood, who feared the project would create noise and other environmental impact.  Use of the Bergamot Station site was opposed by artists at Bergamot Station, who successfully argued that Bergamot had become an irreplaceable resource for the west coast arts community.

The City of Santa Monica and Expo built the facility on land which includes the Verizon site, as well as land that was a parking lot owned by Santa Monica College.  They believe that with this "hybrid site", most environmental impacts from the facility were properly mitigated.

References 

E Line (Los Angeles Metro) stations
Buildings and structures in Santa Monica, California
Railway stations in the United States opened in 2016
2016 establishments in California
Transportation in Santa Monica, California
Pacific Electric stations